Monteith is a rural locality inside a bend on the east (left) bank of the Murray River downstream (south) of Murray Bridge on the other bank. It is governed by the Rural City of Murray Bridge. The dominant industry is dairy farming on the flats near the river and other farming further away from the river. Many of the farms are long and narrow along Bells Road, with irrigated land on the river side and elevated land on the other side of the road, including a dairy and farm house.

The locality of Monteith is traversed by the Princes Highway and bounded by the Adelaide-Melbourne railway line. The eastern end of the Swanport Bridge is at the northwestern corner of the locality.

The town of Monteith was surveyed in 1909, and formally named by Governor Day Bosanquet in 1910 after T. F. Monteith, an early pastoralist in the area.

References 

Towns in South Australia